Throughout his career, musician Jason Newsted has made over 250 recordings, encompassing studio albums, live material and work for film soundtracks, cover albums and charity releases. Although he began his career as a member of the thrash metal group Flotsam and Jetsam, Newsted's work has primarily been with the band Metallica, with whom he played bass guitar between 1987 and 2001. During Newsted's tenure with the band, they produced four studio albums—1988's ...And Justice for All, 1991's Metallica, 1996's Load and 1997's Reload—as well as several supplementary releases. However, Newsted faced difficulty integrating with the group, and found little opportunity to add his music input; having only been given writing credit for only three Metallica songs during his tenure.

Frustrated by his "second-class citizen" status and having been forbidden to work on side projects, Newsted quit in 2001 to work with the band Echobrain. That band's self-titled debut was released in 2002, and featured an alternative metal style unlike Newsted's former work. That same year, Newsted appeared on albums by Papa Wheelie and southern rock band Gov't Mule, as well as becoming a full-time member of veteran Canadian thrash group Voivod. Newsted wrote and recorded three albums with the latter band: Voivod, Katorz and Infini. Since leaving the group, Newsted has been involved with several musical supergroups, releasing a charity double A-side single as part of WhoCares and starring in the television series Rock Star: Supernova, which led to the creation of an eponymous band. Newsted's other work has involved a cameo appearance on Sepultura's album Against playing instruments on Unkle's debut album Psyence Fiction, and releasing a split demo recording under the names of IR8 and Sexoturica.

In 2013, Newsted founded the self-titled band Newsted, who released the EP Metal in January 2013, and the full-length album Heavy Metal Music the following August. Newsted founded and operates the independent record label Chophouse Records, named for his home studio, and has issued several of his releases through the label since 2002.

Songs

Footnotes

Album notes

Single notes

 "Harvester of Sorrow" (Single notes). Metallica. Elektra Records, Vertigo Records. 1988.
 "Enter Sandman" (Single notes). Metallica. Elektra Records, Vertigo Records. 1991.
 "The Unforgiven" (Single notes). Metallica. Elektra Records, Vertigo Records. 1991.
 "Hero of the Day" (Single notes). Metallica. Elektra Records, Vertigo Records. 1996.
 "The Memory Remains" (Single notes). Metallica. Elektra Records, Vertigo Records. 1996.
 "I Disappear" (Single notes). Metallica. Warner Bros. Records, Hollywood Records. 2000.
 "Out of My Mind" / "Holy Water" (Single notes). WhoCares. Ear Music, Eagle Rock Entertainment. 2011.

Other references

Newsted, Jason